Terre Coupee is an unincorporated community in Olive Township, St. Joseph County, in the U.S. state of Indiana.

The community was first settled in 1828 largely by Quakers.

Geography

References

Unincorporated communities in St. Joseph County, Indiana
Populated places established in 1828
Unincorporated communities in Indiana